Patricia Moore (born 1952) is an American industrial designer, gerontologist, and author.

Moore is a Fellow of the Industrial Designers Society of America and in 2016 was named one of The Most Notable American Industrial Designers in the history of the field. ID Magazine selected Moore as one of The 40 Most Socially Conscious Designers in the world. In 2000, a consortium of news editors named her as one of The 100 Most Important Women in America.   In 2012 she was inducted into The Rochester Institute of Technology's “Innovation Hall of Fame” and named a Doctor of Fine Arts by Syracuse University for serving as a “guiding force for a more humane and livable world, blazing a path for inclusiveness, as a true leader in the movement of Universal Design.”. ABC World News featured Moore as one of 50 Americans Defining the New Millennium. Hasselt University in Belgium awarded Moore a PhD in May 2019 for her efforts towards “Inclusion and Excellence.” Moore is the 2019 Recipient of the Cooper Hewitt's National Design Award, as "Design Mind" and the 2020 Center for Health Design's Changemaker Award. In 2022, she was presented with the World Design Organization's World Design Medal.

Education
Moore earned her bachelor's degree from Rochester Institute of Technology, and completed her advanced studies in biomechanics at the New York University School of Medicine and the Rusk Institute of Rehabilitation Medicine. She earned graduate degrees in psychology and social gerontology from Columbia University.

Career
Moore began working with Raymond Loewy International in New York City in 1974. Loewy is widely recognized as the Father of Industrial Design.

In 1979, at the age of 26, Moore began an exceptional and daring sociologic experiment to study the lifestyle of elders in North America. She traveled throughout the United States and Canada, prosthetically disguised and restricted as an elderly women, around 85 years of age. The outcome of this experience was the publication of the book "Disguised". The guises Moore utilized represented a range of health and wealth, allowing her to experience how elders manage their daily lives. The research was completed in 1982, after visiting 116 cities in 14 states and two Canadian provinces.

Moore & Associates opened in New York City in 1980. Now MooreDesign Associates, in Phoenix, Arizona, specializes in developing new products and services for the lifespan needs of consumers of all ages and abilities. Moore's broad range of experience includes Communication Design, Research, Product Development and Design, Environmental Design, Package Design, Transportation Design, Market Analysis, and Product Positioning.

Clients include: AT&T, Bell Communication, Boeing, Citibank, Corning Glass, General Electric, GTE, Herman Miller Healthcare, Honolulu Light Rail, Johnson & Johnson, Kimberly Clark, Kaiser Permanente, Kraft General Foods, Marriott, Maytag, NASA, Norelco, OXO, Pfizer, Playtex, Seoul Design City Project, Sky Train, Phoenix Sky Harbor Airport, Sunbeam, 3M, Valley Metro Rail, and Whirlpool.

Moore was the 1996 & 1997 Carnegie Mellon University Visiting Design Chair, is an Adjunct Professor of Industrial Design at Arizona State University, and has lectured at universities throughout North America, Australia, China, Europe, Korea, Japan, New Zealand and Russia.

Professional Associations
She is the co-author of the American National Standards Committee on Anthropometry. She has been a member of the Board of Trustees of the American Physical Therapy Association, the Harrington Arthritis Research Center, the Herberger Center for Design Excellence at Arizona State University, the Advisory Board of CARF (Certifying Association of Rehabilitation Facilities), and The American Occupational Therapy Association Foundation.

Moore is a Fellow of the Industrial Designers Society of America.

Works
1985, Disguised: A True Story 
2015, Ageing, Ingenuity & Design

Legacy and honors

Moore has received the following recognition:

1996 Community Service Award of the American Rehabilitation Association
1996, American Hospital Association's 1996 NOVA Award for the "Family Road" Care Centers 
1997, Professional Recognition Award by the Arizona Design Institute 
ID Magazine named her as one of the "40 Most Socially Conscious Designers" in the world.
2000, a consortium of news editors and organizations selected Moore as one of the "100 Most Important Women in America."
2000, ABC World News featured Moore as one of "50 Americans Defining the New Millennium."
2005, the American Occupational Therapists Association's annual Leadership Award
2006, the American Society of Interior Designers annual Humanitarian Award
2011, the Royal College of Art Inclusive Design Champion Award
2012, Syracuse University bestowed Moore with an honorary doctorate for serving as a “guiding force for a more humane and livable world, blazing a path for inclusiveness, as a true leader in the movement of Universal Design.”
2012, The Rochester Institute of Technology inducted Moore as a member of the “INNOVATORS Hall of Fame”.
2013, WTS presented Moore with their "Innovative Transportation Solutions Award" 
2016, Industrial Designers Society of America Most Notable American Industrial Designer
2019, U of Hasselt Belgium Honorary Doctorate in Architecture
2019, the National Design Award for "Design Mind"
2020, the Center for Health Design CHANGEMAKER Award

References

Industrial designers
Rochester Institute of Technology alumni
Columbia University alumni
Living people
American gerontologists
1952 births
Women medical researchers